Both Your Houses is a 1933 play written by American playwright Maxwell Anderson. It was produced by the Theatre Guild and staged by Worthington Miner with scenic design by Arthur P. Segal. It opened at the Royale Theatre on March 5, 1933 and ran for 72 performances closing May 6, 1933. It was awarded the 1933 Pulitzer Prize for Drama, and included in Burns Mantle's The Best Plays of 1932–1933.

The title is an allusion to Mercutio's line "a plague on both your houses", in Romeo and Juliet.

Plot

Reception

Reviewing a 1992 production, Variety described Houses as reminiscent of — but "far more bleak and despairing than" — Mr. Smith Goes to Washington and Born Yesterday, calling it "bitter" and "cynical", and assessing the play's message as "heavy-handed" and its characters as "tend(ing) to two-dimensionality."

Cast

 Morris Carnovsky as Levering	
 Russell Collins as Peebles
 Mary Philips as Bus	
 J. Edward Bromberg as Wingblatt	
 Jerome Cowan as Sneden	
 Aleta Freel as Marjorie Gray	
 Walter C. Kelly as Solomon Fitzmaurice	
 Oscar Polk as Mark	
 Robert Shayne as Eddie Wister	
 Shepperd Strudwick as Alan McClean	
 Joseph Sweeney as Ebner
 John Butler as Merton	
 William Foran as Dell	
 John F. Morrissey as Farnum	
 Jane Seymour as Miss McMurty	
 Robert Strange as Simeon Gray

References

External links
 

1933 plays
Broadway plays
Pulitzer Prize for Drama-winning works
Plays by Maxwell Anderson
Plays set in Washington, D.C.